Gabriel Gaudin (1919 - 1999) was a French cyclist who won Paris–Tours in 1943.

Major results
1943
 1st Paris–Tours
 1st 
1945
 2nd 
1949
 6th Critérium National de la Route
1950
 6th Bordeaux–Paris
1952
 2nd

References

External links 

French male cyclists
1919 births
1999 deaths